Progress and Freedom is a political party in Georgia. The party was founded by Kakha Okriashvili and Tsesar Chocheli In 2020. In September 2020, the party joined the coalition Strength Is in Unity.

The coalition nominated both party founders as majoritarian candidates during the 2020 parliamentary election. Kakha Okriashvili received 23,666 votes (39.55%) in the #14 majoritarian constituency and took second place. Caesar Chocheli was nominated in the #11 majoritarian constituency, where he received 17,134 votes (33.78%) and passed to the second round, but refused to participate; nevertheless his last name was on the ballot paper and received 2,076 (7.47%) votes in the second round.  Kakha Okriashvili and Cesar Chocheli refused to enter parliament on party lists (entirely with the opposition, citing rigged elections).

Electoral performance

Parliamentary election

Local elections

References

Political parties in Georgia (country)
Pro-European political parties in Georgia (country)
Political parties established in 2020